Instituto Adolfo Lutz is an analytical laboratory accredited as a National Laboratory of Public Health and Reference Laboratory Macroregional by the Brazilian Ministry of Health. It is based in São Paulo. It is the result of the combination of the Bacteriological Institute and the Dietetic Laboratories, participants Paulista Network of Health in October 26, 1940. The name of the new institute was a posthumous tribute to Adolfo Lutz, first director of the Bacteriological Institute in 1892.

The Institute works in the areas of Bromatology and Chemistry, Biology, Medicine and Pathology, and produces knowledge relevant for public health, developing applied research, promoting and disseminating scientific research, collaborating in the development of technical standards, standardizing diagnostic methods and analytical and organizing courses technical training, improvement and refinement stages.

References

Bibliography
Instituto Adolfo Lutz. Home. Access on July 29, 2010.
CEP (2010). Anexo:1892 in História, Vol 1, 2.ª edição. São Paulo: editora Instituto.

Research institutes in Brazil